Glory! Glory! is a 1989 televangelism comedy film directed by Lindsay Anderson and starring Ellen Greene that originally aired on HBO in two parts.

Plot
A radio preacher's operation is controlled by his honest but bland son. When the preacher is made a media superstar by a savvy huckster, the son is left behind. Everything changes when the son wanders into a bar and witnesses the performance of a woman rock and roll singer and he realizes she is just what he needs to rise to the top of the world of televangelism.
At first, sister Ruth the rock and roll singer takes the job as a means for fame and money. She uses the church for drugs and eventually has a sexual relationship with the preacher's son named Bobby Joe. She also indulges in cocaine and is sexually promiscuous. We soon discover that she is pregnant and decides to have an abortion to help the church and herself to avoid scandal. She then shoots up the charts and becomes a national sensation. With the prospect of going on a national tv network. The network decides to make the show more exciting. They decide to have Sister Ruth do healings on air. At first she had actors but eventually she is able to heal people. Which freaks her out and makes her think she is really a messenger of god. 
Because of the show's popularity a investigative news show decides to profile them. They discover the alleged healed people were either fabricating their story or were temporarily healed. Sister Ruth feeling bad about not healing anyone ends up having an affair with the newsreporter. A church leader worried what Sister Ruth would tell the reporter. He decided that he would have her room bugged and caught the sexual encounter on tape. We soon discover that the news shows producers discover that a church leader stole 2 million dollars and hid it in Switzerland. Forcing his hand and getting the heat off of him. He decides to tell them that Sister Ruth had an abortion. They decide that they will ask her about it on the show. The newsreporter decides to give Ruth a heads up. She tells the church leader and Bobby Joe. So the church leader pulls out the audio tapes of the affair and decide to blackmail him. He gives in and decides not to mention the abortion. 
So the first national episode airs and Sister Ruth sings. She stops singing and tells the audience that at first she took the job because of the money and exposure and then tells them she had an abortion and that she quits. Rev. Bobby Joe comes out and tells the audience that he is a sinner and had a sexual relationship without being married. He admits to blackmail and other sinful things. And finally the church leader comes out and tells everybody that he is the guilty one and that Ruth and Bobby Joe should stay and gets the audience to cheer for them to stay. At the end everybody comes out and hold hands with the main stars even Jesus Christ and Bobby Joe's dead father.

Cast
 Ellen Greene as Ruth
 Richard Thomas as Rev. Bobby Joe
 James Whitmore as Lester Babbitt
 Winston Rekert as Chet
 Barry Morse as Rev. Dan Stuckey
 George Buza as Vincent
 Richard Alden as Sen. Monteith
 Philippe Ayoub as Aide

References

External links

1989 films
1989 television films
Films about television
Films about evangelicalism
Parodies of televangelism
Films directed by Lindsay Anderson
American black comedy films
1980s parody films
American parody films
Religious comedy films
1980s black comedy films
Canadian comedy television films
English-language Canadian films
British television films
1989 comedy films
1980s American films
1980s Canadian films